Christine Marek (born 26 January 1968) is an Austrian politician who served as state secretary of the Ministry of Economy and Labour from January 2007 to November 2010 under the Gusenbauer cabinet. Additionally, she was the first woman to serve as chair of the Viennese People's Party.

References 

1968 births
Living people
21st-century Austrian women politicians
21st-century Austrian politicians